José Feliciano Loureiro Soares (born 23 February 1976) is a Portuguese retired professional footballer who played as a central defender.

Club career
Born in Elvas, Alentejo, Soares signed with Benfica in 1990 to compete his formation, from local O Elvas CAD. He served mainly as backup to the main squad during his spell, also being loaned to F.C. Alverca which acted as the farm team.

Soares made his Primeira Liga debut on 1 February 1998, playing the full 90 minutes in a 2–0 home win against Vitória de Setúbal. Benfica loaned him several times for the duration of his contract, including to S.C. Campomaiorense where he man-marked Mário Jardel out of the game in a surprising 1–0 victory over FC Porto on 19 February 2000, which led to suspension for both players due to on-pitch altercations. After being released he represented various clubs, in France, Germany, Saudi Arabia, Qatar, India and Spain, ending his career in 2010 at the age of 34.

International career
Soares was part of the Portugual U20 national team squad in the 1995 FIFA World Youth Championship, partnering Sporting Clube de Portugal's Beto as the nation finished in third position in Qatar. One year before, he helped the under-18 win the 1994 UEFA European Under-18 Championship.

References

External links

1976 births
Living people
People from Elvas
Portuguese footballers
Association football defenders
Primeira Liga players
Segunda Divisão players
O Elvas C.A.D. players
S.L. Benfica footballers
F.C. Famalicão players
F.C. Alverca players
S.L. Benfica B players
C.D. Aves players
FC Istres players
1. FC Schweinfurt 05 players
Ettifaq FC players
Qatar Stars League players
Al-Shamal SC players
Salgaocar FC players
Tercera División players
CD Badajoz players
Portugal youth international footballers
Portugal under-21 international footballers
Portuguese expatriate footballers
Expatriate footballers in France
Expatriate footballers in Germany
Expatriate footballers in Saudi Arabia
Expatriate footballers in Qatar
Expatriate footballers in India
Expatriate footballers in Spain
Portuguese expatriate sportspeople in France
Portuguese expatriate sportspeople in Germany
Portuguese expatriate sportspeople in Saudi Arabia
Portuguese expatriate sportspeople in Qatar
Portuguese expatriate sportspeople in India
Portuguese expatriate sportspeople in Spain
Saudi Professional League players
Sportspeople from Portalegre District